Alyson Mackenzie Stroker (born June 16, 1987) is an American actress, author and singer. She is the first wheelchair-using actor to appear on a Broadway stage, and also the first to be nominated for and win a Tony Award. Stroker was a finalist on the second season of The Glee Project and later appeared as a guest star on Glee in 2013. She played Anna in Deaf West Theatre's 2015 revival of Spring Awakening, and won the 2019 Tony Award for Best Featured Actress in a Musical for her performance in Oklahoma!

Early life 

Ali Stroker grew up in New Jersey with her parents, Jody and Jim Stroker, as well as an older brother, Jake, and a younger sister, Tory. At the age of two, Stroker and her brother were in a car accident that resulted in a spinal cord injury that left Ali paralyzed from the waist down. Unable to walk, she uses a wheelchair. She attended Ridgewood High School, where she was senior class president and starred in school musicals.

Stroker trained with the Summer Musical Theater Conservatory program at the Paper Mill Playhouse in Millburn, New Jersey.

In 2009, Stroker became the first actor who uses a wheelchair to earn a degree from the New York University Tisch Drama Department, with a degree in Fine Arts.

Career 

Stroker has given solo performances at the Kennedy Center in Washington, D.C., and New York's Town Hall in addition to concert performances at Lincoln Center in New York City.

Stroker starred in the Paper Mill Playhouse's production of The 25th Annual Putnam County Spelling Bee. She later reprised her role in this show at Philadelphia Theatre Company, and that performance earned her a Barrymore Award nomination.

In 2011, Stroker made an appearance in the short film I Was a Mermaid and Now I'm a Pop Star.

In 2012, she auditioned for The Glee Project and was cast for the 12-episode series. She made it to the final episode and placed second, earning a guest role on Glee, playing Betty Pillsbury, Ms. Pillsbury's niece, in Season 4, Episode 14: "I Do".

In 2014, she had a role in the film Cotton, also known as "Everyday Miracles". 

In 2014 and 2015, Stroker had a three-episode role playing Wendy in the MTV series Faking It.

In 2015, she made history by becoming the first actor who uses a wheelchair to appear on a Broadway stage. She originated the role of Anna in Deaf West Theatre's 2015 revival of Spring Awakening.

In 2017, Stroker was cast as Tamara in the ABC show Ten Days in the Valley.

In 2018, she played Ado Annie in St. Ann's Warehouse's critically acclaimed revival of Oklahoma! The production transferred to Broadway's Circle in the Square Theatre in 2019, earning Stroker a Tony Award for Best Featured Actress in a Musical, making her the first person with a disability to be nominated for and to receive that award.

In 2020, she was in Lifetime's Christmas Ever After, airing on December 6, 2020.

In 2021, she played Detective Allison Mulaney on the police procedural television series Blue Bloods, and played Paulette on the mystery-comedy television series Only Murders in the Building.

Advocacy 
Stroker co-chaired an awards luncheon in 2016 for Women Who Care, which supports United Cerebral Palsy of New York City. She is a founding member of Be More Heroic, an anti-bullying campaign which tours the country connecting with thousands of students each year. She has gone to South Africa with ARTS InsideOut where she has held theater classes and workshops for women and children affected by AIDS.

Personal life 
Stroker is bisexual and dated fellow The Glee Project contestant Dani Shay from 2012 to 2015.

Stroker attended the 2019 Tony Awards with her then-boyfriend (now husband), theater director and actor David Perlow. She and Perlow reconnected in 2015 and are founding directors of ATTENTIONTheatre.

In addition to celebrating their first anniversary on July 17, 2022, Stroker announced that she and her husband are expecting their first child.

Credits

Film and television

Theatre

Awards and nominations

References

External links 
 
 
 
 

Living people
American stage actresses
American television actresses
1987 births
American people with disabilities
Actresses from New Jersey
Singers from New Jersey
Tony Award winners
Bisexual actresses
LGBT people from New Jersey
American LGBT singers
Tisch School of the Arts alumni
People from Ridgewood, New Jersey
Ridgewood High School (New Jersey) alumni
People with paraplegia
Actors with disabilities
21st-century American singers
21st-century American women singers
American bisexual actors
Wheelchair users